The Hunt is a long unknown science fiction short story by  Stanisław Lem about a robot hunted by people. It superficially resembles another Lem's short story  The Hunt from  Tales of Pirx the Pilot, however the two are completely different. It was written before the Pirx story, probably in late 1950s. It was found in Lem's archives and published in Przekrój magazine in 2018. An English translation was published in  2019.

Plot
A runaway is chased by humans with dogs. As the story evolves, it becomes clear that it is a robot, an intelligent machine, one of many created by humans to be hunted. For this reason it was endowed with wit and strength and an ability to be afraid, so that it would run away and make a hunt interesting: "... a tangled plot full of surprises, a forest strategy, a duel of cunning, of tactics, including laying double trails, dodging, looping the scent back on itself, crossing white-water streams and aerial bridges formed by fallen trees".

A little girl helps him to hide, but eventually it turns out that her goal was to lay her hands on a gun and shoot the hunted robot herself.

Discussion
The manuscript of story was found by Lem's secretary Wojciech Zemek several decades before the publication, but misled by the resemblance of both the title and the plot, he filed it together with the drafts for the Pirx story.

It is well known that Lem was ruthlessly burning his unpublished works, and the researchers were puzzled why Lem kept this one. Stanisław Bereś attempts to explain this as follows.  Lem never wrote and seldom spoke about his life during World War II in Nazi-occupied Lwow. However one can decipher subtle hints about his experiences of that time in various Lem's works of fiction. Bereś points out an obvious parallel of the runaway's hopeless struggle for his life from The Hunt story, with the experience of the Jews during the Holocaust, including Lem's own. Therefore Bereś suggests that Lem felt overexposing himself in the story, therefore he set it aside and eventually wrote another, a more entertaining version and possibly forgot about the older manuscript.

The two versions  of The Hunt are very different. One is a story of Pirx chasing a damaged mining robot on the Moon struck by a meteorite and firing its laser at any detected motion. On the other hand, the rediscovered version is told from the point of view of the robot designed to be a prey, who is, "like a Roman gladiator, fighting the longest possible struggle for its miserable electronic life".

See also
Korzenie, two other recovered Lem's works found in one file

References 

Works by Stanisław Lem
1950s short stories
Science fiction short stories
Fictional humanoid robots